Sorbus chamaemespilus, the false medlar or dwarf whitebeam, is a species of Sorbus native to the mountains of central and southern Europe, from the Pyrenees east through the Alps to the Carpathians and the Balkans, growing at altitudes of up to 2500 m.

Description
It is a deciduous shrub growing to 2–3 m tall. The leaves are spirally arranged, oval-elliptic, 3–7 cm long, with an acute apex and a serrated margin; they are green on both sides, without the white felting found on most whitebeams. The flowers are pink, with five forward-pointing petals 5–7 mm long; they are produced in corymbs 3–4 cm diameter. The fruit is an oval red pome 10–13 mm diameter.

Taxonomy
It is the sole species in a group that has been called genus Chamaemespilus or Sorbus subgenus Chamaemespilus, distinguished from other subgenera of Sorbus by the pink (not white) flowers with forward-pointing petals (not opening flat). More recently, it has become clear that the simple-leafed species traditionally included in Sorbus form a monophyletic group, and this species could be included in a clade called Aria (genus Aria or Sorbus subgenus Aria).

References

External links 
 

chamaemespilus
Trees of Europe
Flora of France